Joe Sherburne (born January 15, 1996) is an American professional basketball player who last played for Ehingen Urspring of the ProA. He played college basketball for UMBC.

Early life and high school career
Sherburne attended Whitefish Bay High School in Wisconsin. As a freshman, he won a state title but rarely played on the team. Sherburne was named honorable-mention All State in Division 2 during his senior season, but only received offers from several Division II programs. He transferred to Brewster Academy for his postgraduate season, where he was primarily a bench player. Sherburne performed well at a showcase and received a scholarship offer from UMBC, and he committed several weeks later.

College career
Sherburne averaged 10.5 points and 4.5 rebounds per game as a freshman and was named to the America East All-Rookie Team. On December 7, 2016, Sherburne scored a career-high 28 points in a 78–70 win over Mount St. Mary's. As a sophomore, Sherburne averaged 10.9 points and 4.0 rebounds per game on a team that finished 21–13. He averaged 10.7 points and 3.9 rebounds per game as a junior, helping the team reach the NCAA Tournament. Sherburne scored 14 points in the Retrievers' upset of Virginia in the first round of the 2018 NCAA Tournament, becoming the first 16 seed to defeat a 1 seed.

As a senior, Sherburne averaged 13.9 points and 5.6 rebounds per game for another 20-win team. He was named to the First Team All-America East. Sherburne was named the 2019 Academic All-American of the Year after graduating from UMBC in three years with a 4.0 GPA and pursued his master's degree in data science. He was a repeat selection to the First Team Academic All-American, and became the first America East player to be named Academic All-American of the Year. Sherburne finished his UMBC career with the school record for starts, was the sixth all-time scoring leader and is the 1st player in school history with 1500 points, 600 rebounds and 200 assists.

Professional career
In July 2019, Sherburne signed with Ehingen Urspring of the German ProA. He suffered an injury early in the season.

Personal life
Sherburne is the son of Jan and Paul Sherburne, who attended Marquette University Law School, and he has two brothers. Sherburne's brother Jimmy played college basketball at Princeton and helped the team reach the 2011 NCAA Tournament. He is a Green Bay Packers fan and attracted the attention of Packers quarterback Aaron Rodgers after the Virginia upset.

References

External links
UMBC Retrievers bio
Twitter

1996 births
Living people
American men's basketball players
American expatriate basketball people in Germany
UMBC Retrievers men's basketball players
Basketball players from Wisconsin
People from Whitefish Bay, Wisconsin
Ehingen Urspring players
Shooting guards
Brewster Academy alumni
Whitefish Bay High School alumni